The Pârâul Mărului is a left tributary of the river Putna in Romania. It flows into the Putna near Greșu.

References

Rivers of Romania
Rivers of Vrancea County